Turpal-Ali Alvievich Bisultanov (born 14 October 2001) is a Danish Greco-Roman wrestler of Chechen heritage. He won the silver medal in the 87kg event at the 2022 World Wrestling Championships held in Belgrade, Serbia. He won the gold medal in the men's 87 kg event at the 2022 European Wrestling Championships held in Budapest, Hungary. He also won the gold medal in the Greco-Roman style 87 kg at the 2021 European Juniors Wrestling Championships in Germany.

Bisultanov is the younger brother of Rajbek Bisultanov.

References

External links 
 

2001 births
Living people
Place of birth missing (living people)
Danish male sport wrestlers
Danish people of Chechen descent
Russian emigrants to Denmark
European Wrestling Championships medalists
European Wrestling Champions
21st-century Danish people
21st-century Russian people